Sakhrie Park is an urban park located at Middle Tsiepfü Tsiepfhe Ward (Middle AG) in Kohima, Nagaland in north-eastern India. The park was opened to public on 7 April 2016.

The area was previously a garbage dump and sinking area due to which it was prone to landslides. The project was undertaken by a private firm VAST Group which transformed the wasteland into an urban park. The park is equipped with numerous facilities such as a café, a candy store, a children's park, a conference room, a multipurpose hall, and a parking lot.

References

External links 

Kohima
2016 establishments in Nagaland
Parks in Nagaland
Tourist attractions in Kohima
Geography of Kohima